Beth Willis (born 1978) is a British television producer, although she has worked as a script editor on Agatha Christie's Poirot and The Amazing Mrs Pritchard.

She was the producer of the BBC drama series Ashes to Ashes, and was an executive producer (alongside Steven Moffat and Piers Wenger) of the fifth and sixth series of Doctor Who (broadcast in 2010 and 2011).

Willis is the granddaughter of the late Ted Willis, Baron Willis. She was educated in Blackheath, at Blackheath High School and then in Dulwich, South London at the James Allen's Girls' School.

References

External links

British television producers
British women television producers
Living people
People educated at James Allen's Girls' School
1978 births